Founded in 1971, The Libertarian Party of Georgia is a state affiliate of the United States Libertarian Party.

Executive committee
The executive committee in 2017 consisted of four members.

Candidates
Notable candidates include John Monds's run for governor in 2010 and John Monds, Public Service Commission District 1 – the first Libertarian in the country to receive more than 1 Million votes (1,076,780 or 33.4%).

See also

 List of state parties of the Libertarian Party (United States)

References

External links
 The Libertarian Party of Georgia website.

Georgia
Political parties in Georgia (U.S. state)